Pikeville Chapel African Methodist Episcopal Zion Church is a historic African-American church on E. Valley Drive in Pikeville, Tennessee.

The church was built in 1870, during Reconstruction. It was used by multiple congregations and also served as the community's black school until 1925, when a Rosenwald school (Lincoln School) was built. A survey of Tennessee African-American churches conducted in the 1990s identified it as the oldest extant African-American church building in the state. The church still houses an active congregation. It was added to the National Register of Historic Places in 1999.

References

Further reading
 Powerful Artifacts: A Guide to Surveying and Documenting Rural African-American Churches in the South. Center for Historic Preservation, Middle Tennessee State University, July 2000.

African Methodist Episcopal Zion churches in Tennessee
Churches on the National Register of Historic Places in Tennessee
Buildings and structures in Bledsoe County, Tennessee
Churches completed in 1870
Historically segregated African-American schools in Tennessee
National Register of Historic Places in Bledsoe County, Tennessee